The 1970 Round Australia Trial, officially the Ampol Trial was the eleventh running of the Round Australia Trial. The rally took place between 24 June and 5 July 1970. The event covered 10,200 kilometres around Australia. It was jointly won by Jean-Claude Ogier and Lucette Ogier, driving a Citroën DS 21 & Edgar Herrmann and Hans Schüller, driving a Datsun 1600 SSS.

Results

References

Rally competitions in Australia
Round Australia Trial